Osage Community School District is a rural public school district headquartered in Osage, Iowa.

The district occupies sections of Mitchell and Floyd counties, and in addition to Osage, it includes Mitchell and Orchard.

In 2015, Barb Schwamman became the superintendent of the Osage district. She also jointly became superintendent of the Riceville Community School District, and was nominated for the 2019-20 Iowa Superintendent of the Year award.

Schools
The district operates three schools, all in Osage:
 Lincoln Elementary School
 Osage Middle School
 Osage High School

Osage High School

Athletics
The Green Devils participate in the Top of Iowa Conference in the following sports:
Football
Cross Country
 Boys' 1970 Class A State Champions
Volleyball
Basketball
Boys' 2-time State Champions (1923, 1995)
 Girls' 1992 State Champions
Bowling
Wrestling
 Boys' 3-time State Champions (1940, 1965, 1981)
Boys’ 2023 State Dual Meet Champions
Golf
Track and Field
Baseball
Softball

See also
List of school districts in Iowa
List of high schools in Iowa

References

External links
 Osage Community School District
 

School districts in Iowa
Education in Floyd County, Iowa
Education in Mitchell County, Iowa